The CWA International Dagger (formerly known as the Duncan Lawrie International Dagger) and beginning in 2019 as the Crime Fiction in Translation Dagger is an award given by the Crime Writers' Association for best translated crime novel of the year. The winning author and translator receives an ornamental Dagger at an award ceremony held annually. 

Until 2005, translated crime novels were eligible to be nominated for the CWA Gold Dagger. From 2006, translated crime fiction was honored with its own award conceived partly to recognize the contribution of the translator in international works. Until 2008 the International Dagger was named for its sponsor, the Duncan Lawrie Private Bank. In three of the first four years it was awarded, it was won by Fred Vargas and her translator Siân Reynolds. In 2013, the Dagger was shared for the first time between two novels, Alex by Pierre Lemaitre and  The Ghost Riders of Ordebec by Fred Vargas.

In 2014 the CWA awarded it to The Siege by Arturo Perez-Reverte translated by Frank Wynne.

Winners
Winners (in bold) and shortlisted titles.

2000s 
2006

2007

2008

 2009

2010s 
2010

2011

 2012

 2013

2014

 2015

 2016

 2017

 2018

 2019

2020s 
2020

 2021

 2022

References

External links
 The Crime Writers' Association

Crime Writers' Association awards
Awards established in 2006
2006 establishments in the United Kingdom
Translation awards
Mystery and detective fiction awards